The Clarkson Golden Knights women's ice hockey program represented Clarkson University during the 2014–15 NCAA Division I women's ice hockey season. The Golden Knights entered the season as the defending ECAC regular season and national champions.

The Golden Knights successfully defended a share of their conference regular season championship with a win over co-champion Harvard on the last day of the season. They were then defeated in the ECAC semifinals by Cornell. Despite this, they still earned their third straight at-large bid to the NCAA tournament, where they were defeated in the quarterfinals by Boston College.

Offseason

Coaching changes
Both co-head coach Shannon Desrosiers and assistant coach Matt Kelly departed in the offseason, leaving Shannon's husband Matt Desrosiers as sole head coach and as the only coach on the staff. To replace the departed coaches, Britni Smith, a former standout at St. Lawrence, and Meghan Duggan, a former standout at Wisconsin and a member of the United States national team, were hired as assistant coaches.

Recruiting

Roster

Schedule

|-
!colspan=12 style=""| Regular Season

|-
!colspan=12 style=""| ECAC Hockey Tournament

|-
!colspan=12 style=""| NCAA Tournament

Awards and honors

 Erin Ambrose – Patty Kazmaier Award nominee, ECAC Hockey Third Team All-Star, ECAC Hockey weekly Honor Roll (10/5, 1/13), Nutmeg Classic All-Tournament Team, ECAC Hockey Preseason All-League Team
 Genevieve Bannon – ECAC Hockey Player of the Week (10/26), ECAC Hockey weekly Honor Roll (2/22)
 Brielle Bellerive – ECAC Hockey Rookie of the Week (12/10), ECAC Hockey weekly Honor Roll (2/22)
 Renata Fast – ECAC Hockey First Team All-Star
 Savannah Harmon – USCHO.com All-Rookie Team, ECAC Hockey All-Rookie Team, ECAC Hockey Rookie of the Week (10/26, 11/2), ECAC Hockey weekly Honor Roll (1/20, 2/15)
 Olivia Howe – ECAC Hockey weekly Honor Roll (3/1)
 Christine Lambert – ECAC Hockey weekly Honor Roll (2/1)
 Shannon MacAulay – Patty Kazmaier Award nominee, ECAC Hockey Third Team All-Star, ECAC Hockey Player of the Month (October), ECAC Hockey weekly Honor Roll (10/5, 11/18, 12/2), Nutmeg Classic All-Tournament Team (11/29)
 Cayley Mercer – Patty Kazmaier Award nominee, ECAC Hockey First Team All-Star, ECAC Hockey Player of the Week (10/12, 12/10), ECAC Hockey weekly Honor Roll (1/20, 2/9, 2/15)
 Shea Tiley – USCHO.com All-Rookie Team, ECAC Hockey Goaltender of the Year, ECAC Hockey Rookie of the Year, ECAC Hockey Player of the Year finalist, ECAC Hockey First Team All-Star, ECAC Hockey All-Rookie Team, ECAC Hockey Rookie of the Month (October, December, February), ECAC Hockey Goaltender of the Month (February), ECAC Hockey Goaltender of the Week (10/12, 11/2, 11/18), 2/9, ECAC Hockey Rookie of the Week (1/27), ECAC Hockey weekly Honor Roll (10/5, 10/26, 11/25, 12/2, 1/13, 1/20, 2/1, 2/15, 2/22, 3/1)
 Amanda Titus – ECAC Hockey weekly Honor Roll (11/25, 3/1)
 Matt Desrosiers –  ECAC Hockey Coach of the Year

References

Clarkson
Clarkson Golden Knights women's ice hockey seasons